Leroy Taylor Brown (January 1, 1902, in New York City – April 21, 1970) was an American athlete who competed mainly in the high jump. He competed for the United States in the 1924 Summer Olympics held in Paris, France in the high jump where he won the silver medal.

References

Sources

External links
 

American male high jumpers
Olympic silver medalists for the United States in track and field
Athletes (track and field) at the 1924 Summer Olympics
Stuyvesant High School alumni
1902 births
1970 deaths
Track and field athletes from New York City
Medalists at the 1924 Summer Olympics